This is a list of literary works by Steven L. Peck. His academic publications are not included, but can be found on his curriculum vitae.

Fiction

Novels and short story collections

Short stories 
This list does not include stories that were first published in Wandering Realities or Tales from Pleasant Grove. "The Problem" won an honorable mention in the 2010 Brookie and D.K. Brown fiction contest and was first published in Wandering Realities.

Poetry

Non-fiction

Blogs
 By Common Consent
 Mormon Organon

References

Peck, Steven L.
Peck, Steven L.
Peck, Steven L.